Ratte can refer to:

 Landkreuzer P. 1000 Ratte, a prototype heavy German war tank designed during World War II
 Ratte potato, a variety of potato from France
 Ratte, Saône-et-Loire, France
 Étienne-Hyacinthe de Ratte (1722–1805), French astronomer and mathematician